Nokhar is a small town and Union Council in Tehsil Nowshera Virkan, Gujranwala District, Punjab province, Pakistan.

Nokhar is located at a distance of 18 km from Nowshera Virkan and about 33 km from Gujranwala on Gujranwala-Hafizabad road. The distance of Hafizabad from Nokhar is 22 km and Alipur Chattha is 25 km away. The village is under territorial jurisdiction of Police Station Kot Ladha. The total area of Nokhar is about .Majority of people are Muslims alongside Christians as minority. Majority of population belongs to Jatt Saikhu Tribe but Jatt Assoun Tribe is the 2nd largest Jatt Tribe. Notable people include Late Nazar Muhammad Saikhu,Abbas Saikhu Patwari,Late Mansha Saikhu(Ex Nazim),Late Muhammad Riaz Assoun Patwari and Muhammad Asghar Saikhu (retired professor) There are separate High and Middle Schools for both girls and boys including a degree college for Girls. There is also a BHU there.

See Also
 
 
Badoki Saikhwan
Qila Didar Singh
Hamboki
Gujranwala

References
M. Moaz
279
EDITS.

See also

Badoki Saikhwan
Qila Didar Singh
Hamboki
Gujranwala

References

 

Cities and towns in Gujranwala District
Populated places in Wazirabad Tehsil
Union councils of Wazirabad Tehsil